Parvaneh Forouhar (Eskandari; 20 March 1939 – 22 November 1998) was an Iranian dissident and activist who was murdered during the chain murders of Iran in November 1998.

Biography 
Dariush Forouhar's wife, she became a member of the Party of the Iranian Nation when she was a university student, launching an anti-Shah campaign alongside Dariush Forouhar. After a while, they got married. Their witness in absentia was Dr. Mohammad Mossadegh and the clergyman marrying the couple was Ayatollah Zanjani.

Both of the Forouhars were proponents of a democratic and independent Iran and supported the separation of state and religion, they felt that the Islamic Republic led to a concentration of power and made political reform difficult.

Parvaneh Majd Eskandari was stabbed 25 times on the second floor of her home while she was very ill. She was 59 years old at the time of her death. They are survived by a daughter, Parastou Forouhar and a son, Arash Forouhar. Before her death, she had told human rights watchdogs based in New York: "We are living with the fear of being killed. Every night when we go to bed we thank God the Almighty for His blessing of living for another day."

Concerning her mother, Parastou believes: "At the time of her death my mother was wearing an overall over her sleeping gown which indicates that she was not waiting for anyone and because she was killed in front of the wardrobe where family documents were usually kept, she had most probably gone upstairs to fetch the deeds of the house to use it for release of my father on bail."

The death of Parvaneh Eskandari Forouhar and Dariush Forouhar was followed by the assassinations of Mohammad Mokhtari and Mohammad-Ja'far Pouyandeh, two well known Iranian writers a few days later. The Iranian Ministry of Intelligence later denied responsibility for these assassinations and claimed the Ministry employees had acted on his own accord. As of 2014, the government still refuses to allow the families of the victims to hold any vigils or ceremonies for their loved ones.

See also
 1988 executions of Iranian political prisoners
 Chain murders of Iran
 List of Iranian women

References

External links

 Parvaneh Forouhar memorial by the Abdorrahman Boroumand Foundation
 Interview with son, Arash Forouhar from Iranian.com
 An open letter from the Human Right Watch to Iranian president 25 November 1998
 (English) page dedicated to Forouhars
  Parastou Forouhar's website
  Website dedicated to the Forouhars

Iranian murder victims
1939 births
1998 deaths
Iranian women activists
National Front (Iran) student activists
People murdered in Iran
Burials at Behesht-e Zahra
Nation Party of Iran politicians
Iranian dissidents
Politicians from Tehran
20th-century Iranian women politicians
20th-century Iranian politicians